Xi Draconis (ξ Draconis, abbreviated Xi Dra, ξ Dra) is a double or binary star in the northern circumpolar constellation of Draco. It has an apparent visual magnitude of 3.75. At this distance, the apparent magnitude is diminished by 0.03 from extinction caused by intervening gas and dust.

The two components are designated Xi Draconis A (officially named Grumium , a traditional name for the system) and B.

Nomenclature
ξ Draconis (Latinised to Xi Draconis) is the system's Bayer designation. The designations of the two components as Xi Draconis A and B derive from the convention used by the Washington Multiplicity Catalog (WMC) for multiple star systems, and adopted by the International Astronomical Union (IAU).

It bore the traditional names Grumium. This is a graphic corruption of the Latin Grunnum 'snout', as Ptolemy had described this star as being on the jawbone of the dragon. In 2016, the International Astronomical Union organized a Working Group on Star Names (WGSN) to catalogue and standardize proper names for stars. The WGSN decided to attribute proper names to individual stars rather than entire multiple systems. It approved the name Grumium for the component Xi Draconis A on 12 September 2016 and it is now so included in the List of IAU-approved Star Names.

This star was also known as Nodus I or Nodus Primus. Along with Beta Draconis (Rastaban), Gamma Draconis (Eltanin), Mu Draconis (Erakis) and Nu Draconis (Kuma), it was one of Al ʽAwāyd "the Mother Camels", which were later known as the Quinque Dromedarii. 

Namesake
USS Grumium (AK-112) was a United States Navy Crater-class cargo ship named after the star.

Properties
Xi Draconis A is of spectral class K2-III. The possible companion, Xi Draconis B, is a 16th-magnitude star 316 arcseconds away but, most likely, the pairing is just a line-of-sight coincidence.

References

Draco (constellation)
Draconis, Xi
Grumium
K-type giants
087585
Draconis, 32
6688
163588
Durchmusterung objects